Maharaja Kamakhya Narain Singh Bahadur (10 August 1916 – 7 May 1970) of Ramgarh, Jharkhand was the Maharaja Bahadur of Ramgarh Raj and later a politician. He belonged to the Rathore clan of Rajput.

Early life and family
He was educated at Rajkumar College, Raipur and at Mayo College, Ajmer. He became the Raja of Ramgarh in 1919 upon death of his father, Raja Lakshmi Narain Singh. He was married to Maharani Lalita Rajya Lakshmi Devi, daughter of Supradipta Manyabara Lt. Gen. Maharajkumar Singha Shumsher Jung Bahadur Rana of Nepal in 1936. They had a son, Indra Jitendra Narain Singh.

Career
He formed his own political party called the Chota Nagpur Santhal Parganas Janata Party and was a prominent leader in Bihar at that time. His family was the first family in India to use helicopters in election campaign. He served as the vice-president of the Bihar Landholder's Association. He served as president of Akhil Bharatiya Kshatriya Mahasabha in 1942 and 1953. He was also Member of the Managing Committee and General Council of Rajkumar College; Member of the Executive Body of the Bihar War Committee.

Immediately after assuming charge of Ramgarh Raj in August 1937, he diverted his full attention to the interest of estate and his manifold benevolent activities became extremely popular among his subjects. He tried to keep himself in direct touch with all his subjects especially poorer section and was accessible to all. He mostly visited interior parts of his estate and everytime inaugurated some new scheme to foster the growth of a healthy and progressive peasantry.During his tenure, Ramgarh Raj has made good progress in all directions and brought a remarkable change in the life of Ramgarh people. In 1944, he waived the taxes of farmers.

With the wish of freedom fighter Babu Ram Narayan Singh Ji popularly known as "Chhotanagpur Kesari" and efforts of Dr. Rajendra Prasad Ji the historic 53rd Session of INC was held at Ramgarh in he contribution whole heartedly to the success of this session.Even the important Congress leader were full of praise at cordial relations existing between the Maharaja and his subjects. In same year,Netaji Subhash Chandra Bose left Congress and held Samantar Adhiveshan which was supported by Maharaja Saheb and local zamindar Gorinath Singh. In 1946, he left Congress due to differences with Pt Jawaharlal Nehru and formed his own political party Chota Nagpur Santhal Parganas Janata Party  . He entered in active politics in 1946 following the formal accession of the Ramgarh state into the Indian Republic.  In 1952 Bihar Assembly elections, he contested from Barhi and won and became the first Leader of Opposition of Bihar. Later in the Bihar Assembly Elections of 1967, serious opposition was offered by the Raja Bahadur's Janata Party to the ruling Congress government. The Raja Bahadur and his younger brother, Dr. Basant Narain Singh, became Cabinet Ministers in the government headed by Chief Minister of Bihar, Mahamaya Prasad Sinha. He resigned from the party because he was not made the Deputy Chief Minister. In late 1960s, Kamakhya Narayan Singh was popularly an aspirant for Rajput supremacy in Bihar against Rajput stalwart, Sri Satyendra Narayan Sinha (then known as "Coming Chief Minister of Bihar") but was outmanoeuvred. His party later merged with the Swatantra Party. Many of his family members became important political functionaries and legislators.

Last days and death
Singh died of cardiac arrest at 12:25 a.m. (IST) on 7 May 1970 at his residence in Calcutta. In the days preceding his death, he had complained of an abdomen problem. He was cremated on the banks of a river two miles from his Padma, his place of birth near Hazaribagh in Bihar (today in Jharkhand).

References

External links 
Chaturvedi, Ritu & Bakshi, S. eds. (2007), "Bihar Through the Ages", Sarup & Sons Pg. 279

1916 births
1970 deaths
People from Ramgarh district
Jharkhand politicians
Swatantra Party politicians
Bihar MLAs 1967–1969
Leaders of the Opposition in the Bihar Legislative Assembly
People from Kolkata